Lavdara is an uninhabited Croatian island in the Adriatic Sea located east of Dugi Otok.

The island is 3 km long, and the widest part is 1 km wide.

By boat, the coast of the island can be reached in 15 minutes from the Sali, the nearest inhabited place on Dugi Otok.

References

Bibliography

 

Islands of the Adriatic Sea
Islands of Croatia
Uninhabited islands of Croatia